The 1934–35 Divizia B was the first season of the second tier of the Romanian football league system.

The champions of each of the five series qualified to a play-off round. The winner of this play-off played against the last placed team in the 1934–35 Divizia A.

Jiul Petroşani won the play-off, but they lost the promotion to AMEF Arad.

League standings

Seria I

Seria II

Seria III

Seria IV

Seria V

League play-off

Promotion / relegation play-off

See also 
 1934–35 Divizia A

References

Liga II seasons
Romania
2